Alan Morton (1893–1971) was a Scottish international footballer of the 1920s and 1930s.

Alan Morton may also refer to:
Alan Morton (footballer, born 1942), English footballer (Peterborough United, Lincoln City and Chesterfield FC)
Alan Morton (footballer, born 1950), English footballer (Stockport County, Fulham FC and Wimbledon FC)